The following is a list of Elisa songs. Elisa Toffoli is an Italian singer-songwriter, performing under the mononym Elisa. She is one of few Italian musicians to write and record mainly in English.

Original songs

Covers

 
Elisa